Michael P Reitz is a film and TV hair stylist.  He currently occupies the position of department head hair stylist at Star Request Film and Television, where he has worked on a number of high-profile productions.

He was nominated for five consecutive years (2001–2006) to receive an Emmy Award in recognition of his groundbreaking hair design, hair extension design and lacefront wig work on the hit TV series Alias, which ran on ABC for over five years. Reitz was reported to have a collection of wigs in all shades and variations crafted specially for the Sydney Bristow character. This fabulous wig wardrobe is reported to contain over 75 wigs.

Career
In addition to this Reitz has worked with series star Jennifer Garner on several features, including Elektra, where he took Jennifer Garner from beautiful girl-next-door to sexy assassin.
Reitz was also recognized by his peers in 2003, when won a Hollywood Makeup Artists
And Hair Stylists Guild Award for his work in Alias.

More recently Reitz has worked with Jennifer Love Hewitt on the CBS show Ghost Whisperer for the last three years.

Other notable celebrity clients have included Claudia Schiffer, John Travolta, Robert Downey Jr., Catherine Zeta-Jones, Sarah Winter and Kylie Minogue.

In the media
Reitz's work has appeared on several magazine features, including:
TV GUIDE COVER: Feb 8-14 2003.
TV GUIDE COVER September 21–27, 2003.
MOVIELINE - October 1999  Sarah Wynter article pg 18.
ALLURE April 2007  images pgs 202 – 203.
MARIE CLAIRE THE HAIR ISSUE - 10 BEST TV HAIR STYLES TO STEAL 2004
Newsweek September 6, pg 64 "Coast to Coast" ARTS&ENTERTAINMENT
THE HOLLYWOOD REPORTER "Anatomy of a Hit" COVER  featuring the looks of Michael P. Reitz - April 26, 2006
OK Magazine - October 2, 2006 pg 62-67 Jennifer Love Hewitt
Marie Claire May 2004  Presented by Neutrogena - 13 Going On 30 poster - Jennifer Garner pgs 41, 42
AMERICAN SALON January 2005  pg 44.

Quotes on Michael Reitz
"What isn’t done digitally or with body doubles can be done with costumes and makeup. For those of you who aren’t familiar with her, Jennifer Garner is the star of the show Alias, in which she plays a female James Bond. I think Garner is incredibly beautiful and one of the proofs of that for me has been that she can wear every style and color of wig imaginable and still look drop-dead gorgeous. Who can pull that off, except someone who’s naturally really beautiful? I recently watched an episode from the first season, which is out on DVD, and I listened to the audio commentary. Garner’s hair and wig designer, Michael Reitz, was mentioned several times; it turns out that he has to carefully cut and style every wig she wears so that it looks flattering on her, and sometimes the color makes her skin look so awful that they have to use specially-colored makeup in order to cover up her natural color. Reitz, it turns out, is so good at what he does that he’s been nominated for Emmys three years in a row and won a Hollywood Guild Award. Those that are in the industry can look at Garner’s costumes and identify a master working behind the scenes to create the illusion that she looks great in everything. Most of us are not quick to see the illusion, but we should cultivate the ability to do so."

Awards and nominations

Nominated for Emmy Award for Alias
2006 Outstanding Hairstyling for a Series
2005 Outstanding Hairstyling for a Series
2004 Outstanding Hairstyling for a Series
2003 Outstanding Hairstyling for a Series
2002 Outstanding Hairstyling for a Series

2004 Hollywood Makeup Artist and Hair Stylist Guild Award
Nominated
Best Character Hair Styling - Television Series for: "Alias" (2001)
Best Contemporary Hair Styling - Television Series for: "Alias" (2001)

2003 Hollywood Makeup Artist and Hair Stylist Guild Award
Winner
Best Character Hair Styling - Television Series for: "Alias" (2001)
Nominated
Best Contemporary Hair Styling - Television Series for: "Alias" (2001)

Filmography
Make-up department:
 "Ghost Whisperer" (hair stylist: Jennifer Love Hewitt) (18 episodes, 2006–2007)
 Catch and Release (2006/II) (hair stylist: Ms. Garner)
 "Alias" (hair stylist) (105 episodes, 2001–2006) (wig designer: Jennifer Garner) (61 episodes, 2001–2006)
 Elektra (2005) (hair stylist: Jennifer Garner) (as Michael Peter Reitz)
 13 Going on 30 (2004) (hair stylist: Jennifer Garner)
 Daredevil (2003) (hair stylist: Jennifer Garner)
 Lucky Numbers (2000) (hair stylist) (as Michael P. Reitz)
 "Action" (1999) TV series (hair designer: Illeana Douglas) (unknown episodes)
 Stigmata (1999) (hair stylist)
 Friends & Lovers (1999) (hair stylist)
 Desperate But Not Serious (1999) (hair designer: Claudia Schiffer) (as Michael P. Reitz)
 "Brimstone" (1998) TV series (key hair stylist) (unknown episodes)
 "Sweet Valley High" (1994) TV series (hair department head) (unknown episodes, 1994–1998)
 Blindfold: Acts of Obsession (1994) (TV) (hair stylist) (as Michael P. Reitz)

Notes

References
Allure, April 2007, p 202 – 203
AMERICAN SALON January 2005  p 44
Hair Boutique
The Hollywood Reporter, front cover, April 26, 2006

Konkle, M.; Made in Whose Image: God’s or the Media’s?
Levin, J. American Salon, January 2005 page 44
TV Guide
TV Guide, front cover, Feb 8-14 2003
TV Guide, front cover, Sept 21-27 2003
Marie Claire, "The Hair Issue – 2004, 10 BEST TV HAIR STYLES TO STEAL"
Marie Claire, May, 13 Going On 30 poster, Jennifer Garner p 41, 42
Movieline, p18, S Wynter, October 1999
Newsweek, Arts & Entertainment, September 6, pg 64 "Coast to Coast"
OK Magazine - October 2, 2006 p 62-67

External links
The Make Up Gallery

American hairdressers
Living people
Year of birth missing (living people)